James Fitzsimons (born 16 December 1936) is a former Irish Fianna Fáil politician.

A publican from Navan, County Meath, he was educated at St Patrick's Classical School in Navan. Fitzsimons was elected to the 21st Dáil as a Fianna Fáil Teachta Dála (TD) for the Meath constituency on his first attempt at the 1977 general election, and re-elected until retiring at the 1987 general election to concentrate on his European Parliament seat. He was succeeded in the Dáil by Noel Dempsey.

He was appointed as Minister of State at the Department of Industry and Energy on 28 October 1982 by the short-lived 1982 Haughey Government in a reshuffle. The Dáil was dissolved on 4 November after the government lost a vote of confidence.

He was elected as an MEP at the 1984 European Parliament election and retained his seat for 20 years, until retiring at the 2004 European Parliament election.

References

External links

Fianna Fáil TDs
1936 births
Living people
Members of the 21st Dáil
Members of the 22nd Dáil
Members of the 23rd Dáil
Members of the 24th Dáil
People educated at St Patrick's Classical School
People from Navan
MEPs for the Republic of Ireland 1999–2004
MEPs for the Republic of Ireland 1994–1999
MEPs for the Republic of Ireland 1989–1994
MEPs for the Republic of Ireland 1984–1989
Fianna Fáil MEPs
Ministers of State of the 23rd Dáil